Glad Valley is an unincorporated community in Ziebach County, South Dakota, United States.

Glad Valley was laid out in 1926, and named for the nearby Glad Valley Ranch.

References

Unincorporated communities in Ziebach County, South Dakota
Unincorporated communities in South Dakota
Populated places established in 1926